The 2014–15 ABA season was the fourteenth season of the American Basketball Association. The season began in November 2014 and ended in March 2015. The playoffs happened in March 2015, with the finals in April 2015.

Season standings

American Basketball Association (2000–present) seasons
ABA